Padatik (The Guerrilla Fighter) is a 1973 Bengali drama film directed by noted Parallel Cinema director Mrinal Sen.

This film is considered to be the third film of Mrinal Sen's Calcutta trilogy, the others being Interview, and Calcutta 71.

Plot
A political activist escapes the prison van and is sheltered in a posh apartment owned by a sensitive young woman. Both are rebels: the activist against political treachery and the other on social level. Both are bitter about badly organized state of things. Being in solitary confinement, the fugitive engages himself in self-criticism and, in the process, questions the leadership. Questions are not allowed, obeying that is mandatory. Displeasure leads to bitterness, bitterness to total rift. The struggle has to continue, both for the political activist, now segregated, and the woman in exile.

Cast
 Dhritiman Chatterjee
 Simi Garewal
 Bijon Bhattacharya
 Jochon Dastidar
 Ashima Sinha
 Dhruba Mitra
 Pravas Sarkar

External links
 
 On the Mrinal Sen website
 A review

References

1973 films
1973 drama films
Bengali-language Indian films
Films directed by Mrinal Sen
Films set in Kolkata
Films whose writer won the Best Original Screenplay National Film Award
1970s Bengali-language films